The 1962 UAAP men's basketball tournament was the 25th year of the men's tournament of the University Athletic Association of the Philippines (UAAP)'s basketball championship. Hosted by National University, the UE Warriors defeated the UP Parrots in a single game finals taking their fourth UAAP men's basketball championship.

Participating schools

Finals
Underrated University of the East recaptured the UAAP senior cage championship by demolishing University of the Philippines, 70-55, before a crowd of 5,000 at the Rizal Memorial Coliseum. The Warriors lost the title to Far Eastern University the previous year.

Coach Baby Dalupan, the winningest mentor in the circuit with then four championships tucked on his belt, hinged on the shooting of Carlos Quitzon, Angelito Flores and Norman de Vera, the excellent rebounding of Godofredo Realubit and Jimmy Mariano and heads-up defensive plays by rookie Nathaniel Canson, the speediest dribbler of the league, to post the victory.

References

External links

25
1962 in Philippine basketball